Ze'ev Sherf (21 April 1904 – 18 April 1984) was an Israeli politician who held several ministerial portfolios in the 1960s and 1970s.

Biography 
Born in Czernowitz in Austria-Hungary (today Chernivtsi, Ukraine), Sherf made aliyah in 1925. He was a member of Poale Zion's youth movement, and was a founder of the "Socialist Youth" movement.

During World War II he was a member of the Haganah command, and following the war, worked for the Jewish Agency for Israel for two years.

In 1947 he was appointed secretary of the Situation Committee, which helped create the administrative apparatus of the new state. Following independence, he served as secretary of the government until 1957.

In the 1965 elections he was voted into the Knesset on the Alignment's list. In November 1966 he was appointed Minister of Trade and Industry, and in August 1968 also became Minister of Finance. He held both posts until after the 1969 elections, when he became Minister of Housing. He was not re-elected in the 1973 elections and lost his place in the cabinet the following year when Golda Meir resigned as Prime Minister.

Books
Law and Administration in the State, 1953
Three Days, 1959

External links 

1984 deaths
1904 births
Romanian emigrants to Mandatory Palestine
Israeli people of Romanian-Jewish descent
Bukovina Jews
Haganah members
Alignment (Israel) politicians
Ministers of Finance of Israel
Ministers of Housing of Israel
Members of the 6th Knesset (1965–1969)
Members of the 7th Knesset (1969–1974)